Jabaquara Intermunicipal Terminal is an intermunicipal bus terminal in São Paulo, Brazil.  Along with the Tietê Bus Terminal and the Palmeiras-Barra Funda Intermodal Terminal, it is one of the most important bus terminals in the State of São Paulo. tel.11 5060-4275 of ambulatory.

References

External links 
 Official website of the Socicam, the company that administers the terminal (Portuguese)

Transport in São Paulo
Bus stations in Brazil